Kids in Love is a 2016 British coming of age drama directed by Chris Foggin in his feature-length debut from a screenplay by Sebastian de Souza, and Preston Thompson. It stars Will Poulter, Alma Jodorowsky, Jamie Blackley, Sebastian de Souza, Preston Thompson, Cara Delevingne and Gala Gordon. The film is about a group of young friends in London, imitating art and enjoying a fast-paced lifestyle. The film had its world premiere on 22 June 2016, at the Edinburgh International Film Festival. The film was released in a limited release and through video on demand on 26 August 2016, by Signature Entertainment.

Plot
Jack (Will Poulter) is a gap-year student in London who isn’t convinced that he wants the life that has been mapped out for him. He meets a young woman (Alma Jodorowsky), who introduces him to the bohemian side of the city.

Cast

Will Poulter as Jack
Alma Jodorowsky as Evelyn
Sebastian de Souza as Milo
Preston Thompson as Cassius
Cara Delevingne as Viola
Gala Gordon as Elena
Jamie Blackley as Tom
Pip Torrens as Graham
Geraldine Somerville as Linda
Jack Fox as Lars
Genevieve Gaunt as Issi
Jack Bannon as Alex

Production
As a low budget film, the principal photography started on 19 August 2013, and ended after four weeks on 14 September. London was the main location of the shooting, with scenes at the Notting Hill Carnival.

Release
In February 2016, Signature Entertainment and Factoris Films acquired distribution rights to the film in the United Kingdom and France respectively. The film had its world premiere at the Edinburgh International Film Festival on 22 June 2016. It was released in a limited release and through video on demand on 26 August 2016.

References

External links 
 
 

2016 films
2010s coming-of-age drama films
2016 independent films
2016 romantic drama films
2010s teen drama films
2010s teen romance films
British coming-of-age drama films
British independent films
British romantic drama films
British teen drama films
British teen romance films
Ealing Studios films
2010s English-language films
Films set in London
Films shot in London
2010s British films